Deakin University's School of Medicine is based at the Waurn Ponds campus in Geelong, Victoria, Australia.  It offers a four-year, graduate-entry, Doctor of Medicine (MD) degree.

The medical degree is a 4 year course, with 2 years of pre-clinical education at the University campus in Waurn Ponds, and then 2 years clinical education and experience in one of 5 clinical schools.

The School has also developed other new undergraduate and postgraduate programs, namely Optometry, Medical Imaging, Agricultural Health and Medicine, Units in the Bachelor of Biomedical Science and Health Science Majors, Bachelor of Health and Medical Science Honours, and a Masters in Clinical Leadership.

Research
The School of Medicine houses a vibrant program of research, including over 100 academic and other research staff as well as nearly 100 research students. The School has established a reputation for research excellence, underpinned by success in NHMRC and other competitive funding schemes, and research publications of consistently high impact. This is underpinned by strong strategic partnerships, including with Barwon Health, CSIRO (AAHL) and a network of clinical providers across Western Victoria.

The School's research is centred on four Research Pillars:

Infection, Immunity & Cancer
Metabolic & Musculoskeletal Medicine
Neuroscience
Rural & Regional Health
Each of the School's Strategic Research Centres, Research Groups and Research Partnerships align closely with one or more of these Research Pillars.

History

On 8 April 2006, the Prime Minister of Australia, John Howard announced that Deakin University would host Victoria's third medical school.  Under Prof Brendan Crotty, the first cohort of 120 students commenced their BMBS degree on 7 February 2008.  

The School of Medicine was opened on 1 May 2008 by the former Prime Minister of Australia, Kevin Rudd.

In 2011, there  were 130 Commonwealth Supported Places available. This figure included 33 Bonded Medical Places and 5 Medical Rural Bonded Scholarships (MRBS).

DUX of School, Bachelor of Medicine Bachelor of Surgery/Doctor of Medicine
 2017 Elina Ziukelis
 2016 Timothy Bayles
 2015 Shannon Trenwith
 2014 Steven Nicolaides
 2013 Benjamin Fleming
 2012 Sian Campbell
 2011 Waltraud Almhofer

Teaching hospitals
The first two pre-clinical years of the course are based at the Geelong Campus at Waurn Ponds.

In third and fourth years, students are based at clinical schools located at the following teaching hospitals affiliated with the Deakin University School of Medicine:
 Geelong Hospital (Barwon Health)
 Ballarat Base Hospital (Ballarat Health Services)
 Warrnambool Hospital (South West Healthcare)
 Box Hill Hospital (Eastern Health)
 RCCS Program (Third year only)

Deakin University RCCS Program (Rural)

A cohort of students spend all their third year attached to a regional general practice where they complete a 'parallel rural community curriculum' through the Rural Community Clinical School (RCCS). Students cover the same material as those studying in hospital settings. Third year Deakin University medical students in the RCCS program are hosted in general practices in regional and rural Victorian towns including Bacchus Marsh, Daylesford, Colac, Ararat, Camperdown, Casterton, Horsham, Stawell and Hamilton. 

Teaching is provided by  face-to-face instruction by general practitioners, clinical skills trainers, visiting medical and surgical specialists, online lectures and tutorials. Unlike in the other clinical schools attached to Deakin, the RCCS curriculum follows a Longitudinal Integrated Clerkship (LIC) model. Through this model, rather than cycling through set rotations throughout the year, students encounter a wide range of patient presentations which, with the complementation of online teaching, cover the same content that is encountered through conventional rotation-based learning.  Another aspect of the RCCS program is that students perform "parallel consulting" in general practice. This means the student consults one-on-one with a patient, then presents their findings to the supervising doctor. The doctor completes the consultation with the student observing, giving the student opportunities to develop practical clinical skills such as history taking, physical examination, case presentation and medical management. By placing students in rural general practices rather than major metropolitan hospitals, the aim of RCCS is to give students exposure to primary care and country family medicine, with the ultimate objective of encouraging more medical graduates to work in regional Australia, particularly in general practice.

Deakin Medical Students' Association 
MeDUSA, the Deakin Medical Students' Association, was established in 2008 to coincide with the entry of the first cohort of students.

References

External links
 Deakin University School of Medicine - Official website
 MEDUSA - Deakin University Medical Students Society

Medical schools in Australia
Education in Victoria (Australia)
Deakin University
Buildings and structures in Geelong
Medical and health organisations based in Victoria (Australia)
2008 establishments in Australia